Zubeida Begum Dhanrajgir (1911 – 21 September 1988) was an Indian actress. She starred in the first Indian talkie movie Alam Ara (1931). Her credits include early hits Devdas (1937), and Sagar Movietone's first talkie, Meri Jaan.

Early life
Born in 1911 at Surat city of Gujarat in western India, Zubeida was the daughter of Nawab Sidi Ibrahim Muhammad Yakut Khan III of Sachin State and Fatima Begum. She had two sisters, Sultana and Shehzadi, both actresses. She was among the few girls who entered films at a tender age during a time when it was not considered an appropriate profession for girls from respectable families.

Career
Zubeida was only 12 when she made her debut in Kohinoor. Through the 1920s she made infrequent appearances on screen along with Sultana who, by then, had become one of Indian cinema's loveliest leading ladies. One of the films to star the two sisters was Kalyan Khajina in 1924. They had also shared the screen in Zubeida's first blockbuster, Veer Abhimanyu released two years earlier, that also had their mother, Fatima Begum, playing an important role.

In 1925 Zubeida had nine releases, amongst them Kala Chor, Devdasi and Desh Ka Dushman. A year later she starred in her mother's film, Bulbul-e-Paristan. 1927 was memorable for her with movies Laila Majnu, Nanand Bhojai and Naval Gandhi's Sacrifice which were very successful movies at this time. The latter, based on Rabindranath Tagore's 'Balidan', also starred Sulochana Devi, Master Vithal and Jal Khambatta. It condemned the age-old custom of animal sacrifice in certain Kali temples in Bengal. The Members of the Indian Cinematograph Committee were wowed by this "excellent and truly Indian film". Its European members recommended that it be sent abroad for screening.

Zubeida starred in a string of silent films before Alam Ara proved to be the turning point in her career and was her biggest hit. She suddenly was highly in demand and got wages high above the standards for a woman in the film industry at that time.

Through the '30s and early '40s she made a hit team with Jal Merchant and starred in several successful historical epic films playing characters like Subhadra, Uttara and Draupadi. She was also successful in portraying emotions with films such as Ezra Mir's Zarina which had her playing a vibrant, volatile circus girl whose kisses steamed up the screen and sparked off heated debate on censorship. Zubeida was one of the few actresses to make a successful transition from the silent era to the talkies.

In 1934 she set up Mahalakshmi Movietone with Nanubhai Vakil and had box-office bonanzas in Gul-e-Sonobar and Rasik-e-Laila. She continued to appear in one or two films a year till 1949. Nirdosh Abla was her last film.

Personal life
Zubeida married Maharaj Narsingir Dhanrajgir Gyan Bahadur of Hyderabad. She was the mother of Humayun Dhanrajgir and Dhurreshwar Dhanrajgir. Dhurreshwar is the mother of model Rhea Pillai.

Death
Zubeida spent her last years at the family's Bombay palace, Dhanraj Mahal. She died on 21 September 1988 and was laid to rest at Chhatrapathi Shivaji Maharaj Marg, Apollo Bunder, Colaba, south Mumbai.

Filmography

 Gul-e-Bakavali (1924)
 Manorama (1924)
 Prithvi Vallabh (1924)
 Sati Sardarba (1924)
 Kala Chor (1925)
 Devadasi (1925)
 Indrasabha (1925)
 Ra Navghan (1925)
 Rambha of Rajnagar (1925)
 Deshna Dushman (1925)
 Yashodevi (1925)
 Khandani Khavis (1925)
 Sati Simantini (1925)
 Bulbule Paristan (1926)
 Kashmeera (1926)
 Raja Bhoj (1926)
 Indrajal (1926)
 Sati Menadevi (1926)
 Laila Majnu (1927)
 Nanand Bhojai (1927)
 Balidan (1927)
 Chamakti Chanda (1928)
 Samrat Ashok (1928)
 Golden Gang (1928)
 Heer Ranjha (1928)
 Kanakatara (1929)
 Mahasundar (1929)
 Milan Dinar (1929)
 Shahi Chor (1929)
 Jai Bharati (1929)
 Devadasi (1930)
 Garva Khandan (1930)
 Joban Na Jadu (1930)
 Veer Rajput (1930)
 Sinh No Panja (1930)
 Meethi Churi (1931)
 Diwani Duniya (1931)
 Roop Sundari (1931)
 Hoor-E-Misar (1931)
 Karmano Kaher (1931)
 Nadira (1931)
 Alam Ara (1931)
 Meri Jaan (1931)
 Veer Abhimanyu (1931)
 Meerabai (1932)
 Subhadra Haran (1932)
 Zarina (1932)
 Harijan (1933)
 Bulbule Punjab (1933)
 Pandav Kaurav (1933)
 Mahabharat (1933)
 Gul Sanobar (1934)
 Nanand Bhojai (1934)
 Radha Mohan/Nand Ke Lala (1934)
 Rasik-e-Laila (1934)
 Seva Sadan (1934)
 Birbal Ki Beti (1935)
 Gulshane Alam (1935)
 Mr. and Mrs. Bombay (1936)
 Aurat Ki Zindagi (1937)
 Kiski Pyari (1937)
Devdas (1937)
Nirdosh Abla (1949)
Awāra (1951): Young Rita

References

External links

 
 India Heritage:Performing Arts:Cinema In India:Personalities:Silent Screen Stars.
 Zubeida profile

1911 births
1988 deaths
Indian silent film actresses
Indian film actresses
Actresses in Hindi cinema
20th-century Indian actresses
Gujarati people
People from Gujarat
Actresses in Gujarati cinema
Converts to Hinduism from Islam